Pirangoclytus insignis is a species of beetle in the family Cerambycidae. It was described by Chevrolat in 1862.

References

Clytini
Beetles described in 1862